Guča (selo) is a village in the municipality of Lučani, Serbia. According to the 2011 census, the village has a population of 1,955 people.

References

Populated places in Moravica District